St James' Pit is a  geological Site of Special Scientific Interest in Norwich in Norfolk. It is a Geological Conservation Review site and part of Mousehold Heath Local Nature Reserve.

This site has been designated because of its jaw and vertebra fossils of Liodon and Mosasaurus, which were two genera of mosasaurs, large marine reptiles dating to the Upper Cretaceous (Campanian-Maastrichtian).

References

Sites of Special Scientific Interest in Norfolk
Geological Conservation Review sites